The Minnesota State Academies are two separate schools, the Minnesota State Academy for the Blind and the Minnesota State Academy for the Deaf, both established by the legislature in 1863. They are public residential schools for Minnesota children with special needs, serving students from birth to age 21. They are operated by the state.

The schools are located about a mile apart in Faribault, on bluffs above the Cannon River. Two special state highways connect the campuses to Minnesota State Highway 60 and downtown Faribault: 299 goes north to the Academy for the Deaf; 298 goes south to the Academy for the Blind.

Blind Department Building and Dow Hall at the State Academy for the Blind are listed on the National Register of Historic Places, as are the Administration Building/Girls' Dormitory and Noyes Hall at the State Academy for the Deaf.

External links
Minnesota State Academy for the Blind
Minnesota State Academy for the Deaf

Boarding schools in Minnesota